Grachyovsky (masculine), Grachyovskaya (feminine), or Grachyovskoye (neuter) may refer to:
Grachyovsky District, name of several districts in Russia
Grachyovsky (rural locality), a rural locality (a selo) in Kaluga Oblast, Russia